The 1912–13 team finished with a record of 3–8. It was the 1st year for head coach LeRoy Brown. The team captain was Russell Mumford.

Schedule

|-
!colspan=9 style="background:#006633; color:#FFFFFF;"| Non-conference regular season

1. EMU shows list the game being played on 2/27 and CMU list the game on 3/1.

References

Eastern Michigan Eagles men's basketball seasons
Michigan State Normal